A business game is a simulation game which simulates a business.

The expression may also refer to one of the following.

Business simulation
Simulations and games in economics education
Training Simulation
Business simulation game, a type of videogames
Another name for the board game Mine a Million